Too Much Sugar for a Dime is an album by Henry Threadgill, released in 1993 on the Axiom label.  It has been described as: "a mad, glorious romp which explores some very dark timbres and tonalities and yet remains witty, fresh and consistently exciting." (Richard Cook & Brian Morton, The Penguin Guide to Jazz on CD).

Track listing
All compositions written by Henry Threadgill.
 "Little Pocket Size Demons" – 10:49
 "In Touch" – 8:49
 "Paper Toilet" – 5:39
 "Better Wrapped / Better Unrapped" – 13:05
 "Too Much Sugar" – 2:58
 "Try Some Ammonia" – 12:23

Personnel
Henry Threadgill — alto saxophone
Mark Taylor — French horn
Edwin Rodriguez — tuba
Marcus Rojas — tuba
Dorian L. Parreott II — tuba (tracks 2, 4, 6)
Brandon Ross — guitar (electric & acoustic)
Masujaa — guitar (electric)
Simon Shaheen — oud and violin (2, 4)
Jason Hwang — violin (2, 4)
Leroy Jenkins — violin (2, 4)
Gene Lake — drums (exc. track 5)
Larry Bright — drums (2, 4), cymbals (5)
Miguel Urbina — afrovenezuelan drums, Culo'e puya drums, fulía drums (2, 4, 5)
Johnny Rudas — afrovenezuelan drums, Culo'e puya drums, fulía drums (2, 4)
Mossa Bildner — vocals (2)
Arenae — vocals (2)

1993 albums
Henry Threadgill albums
Axiom (record label) albums
Albums produced by Bill Laswell